Ebrima is an OpenType font designed to support African writing systems. It was created by Microsoft and is part of the Windows 7 operating system. It supports advanced OpenType features such as combining diacritics positioning. Its Latin alphabet is based on the Segoe font.

Writing systems 
 Adlam script
 Greek script (partial) for the International Phonetic Alphabet
 Latin script with extensions for the African reference alphabet and the International Phonetic Alphabet
 N'Ko script
 Osmanya script
 Tifinagh
 Vai script

See also 
 Ebrima Font Family (2012). Microsoft Typography

Unicode typefaces
Windows 7 typefaces